Dominguez Channel is a  river in southern Los Angeles County, California, in the center of the Dominguez Watershed of .

The watershed area is 96% developed and largely residential. Subsurface storm drain tributaries and open flood control channels flow into the channel. The channel originally was named after a racial slur but was changed in 1938.

Course
The stream begins just south of 116th Street in Hawthorne and flows through El Camino Village, Gardena, Alondra Park, Torrance, Harbor Gateway, Carson, and Wilmington, and empties into the East Basin of the Port of Los Angeles, in San Pedro Bay on the Pacific Ocean. There is a public community bicycle path with signage and native plant landscaping built atop the Dominguez River levee for several miles in the upper reach of the river in Hawthorne and El Camino Village and again in the lower reach of the river between Gardena and Carson, with several miles of the bicycle route in Torrance. There is a gap in the middle stretch, as well as in Carson, Torrance, and Wilmington through the oil refinery to the terminus of the levee at the ocean harbor. Lower Dominguez Channel, for the last few miles before reaching the ocean harbor, becomes an estuary mixing freshwater and ocean water together, overlying a wetland soil between uncemented boulder levees that serves as wildlife habitat and wildflower habitat for migratory native birds and native wetland vegetation.

Incidents
In 1941, the channel and surrounding wetlands caught fire, sparked by firefighters burning oil seepage from a quake-damaged pipeline. The channel suffered frequent flooding until it was lined with rocks in the 1960s.

In October 2021, the channel had a pollution event that caused a release of hydrogen sulfide into the air, sickening and forcing evacuation of residents in the city of Carson, as well as Gardena, Long Beach, Redondo Beach, Torrance and Wilmington and other parts of Los Angeles County. A warehouse fire led to the accidental release of ethanol used for hand sanitizer, which killed vegetation in the channel which rapidly decayed and released hydrogen sulfide. The South Coast Air Quality Management District issued notices of violation to four companies connected to the warehouse in question. 

The warehouse was owned by Artnaturals, a cosmetics company that had not made hand sanitizer before the COVID-19 pandemic, but began making it due to the surge in demand for the product. It caught fire on September 30, 2021. Water sprayed by firefighters flushed sanitizer and other chemicals into the Dominguez channel. 

The issue was addressed by pumping oxygen into the channel, because hydrogen sulfide is produced in unoxygenated environments. During the initial two months, the Los Angeles County Department of Public Works paid for more than 3,000 people to move into hotels who were experiencing symptoms and also provided 27,000 air purifiers to homes to mitigate the powerful odor.

In December of 2021 and January of 2022, a release of untreated sewage into Dominguez Channel prompted five beaches to close. The spill began after a concrete pipe in Carson collapsed. The pipe was 60 years old, and was due to be replaced in less than a year. It had been stressed by the buildup of Sulfuric acid, and the previous week's rainfall.

Crossings
Crossings (bridges) over Dominguez River from the mouth upstream to the source, includes 6 railroad bridges, 23 public streets, several private roads inside oil refinery properties, 2 freeways, 2 state highways, and 2 parking lots (one of which is at a California community college).  The year built of the bridge are within parentheses behind the name of the bridge are listed below:

 Railroad
 North Henry Ford Avenue (2002)
 Railroad
 East Anaheim Street (1997)
 Railroad
 California State Route 1 - East Pacific Coast Highway (1948)
 East Sepulveda Boulevard (1959)
 Alameda Street (1959)
 Railroad
 Private roads
 East 223rd Street & Wilmington Avenue (1963)
 Railroad
 Interstate 405 - San Diego Freeway (1962)
 East Carson Street (1959)
 East 213th Street (1961)
 Avalon Boulevard (1962)
 East Del Almo Boulevard
 South Main Street (1961)
 South Figueroa Street (1963)
 West 190th Street (1966)
 Interstate 110 and connectors (1960 and 1985)
 West 182nd Street (1964)
 South Vermont Avenue (1958)
 Normandie Avenue (1958)
 South Western Avenue (1960)
 State Route 91 - Artesia Boulevard (1958)
 Gramercy Place (1959)
 Van Ness Avenue (1960)
 Crenshaw Boulevard (1960)
 Cherry Avenue (1960)
 West Redondo Beach Boulevard (1960)
 Parking lot of El Camino College
 Manhattan Beach Boulevard (1961)
 Marine Avenue (1961)
 West 147th Street (1974)
 Crenshaw Boulevard (1962)
 West Rosecrans Avenue (1962)
 West 135th Street (1961)
 West El Segundo Avenue (1966)
 Railroad
 Entrance 17
 Private road
 West 120th Street
 Crenshaw Boulevard (1990)
 Crenshaw Station Park & Ride (1994)
 Ramps to Interstate 105
 Interstate 105 and Metro Green Line (1992)

References

External links
LACDPW: Dominguez Watershed
Friends—Amigos of Dominguez Watershed

=
 Los Angeles Bikeway Map (Metro.net) - HTML
 Los Angeles Bikeway Map (Metro.net) - PDF hosted on Dropbox
 Friends/Amigos of the Dominguez Watershed
 Hidden Waters Book Blog: Dominguez Channel, Los Angeles
 GoPro Laguna Dominguez Bike Path

Rivers of Los Angeles County, California
Los Angeles Harbor Region
South Bay, Los Angeles
Washes of California
Carson, California
Gardena, California
Harbor Gateway, Los Angeles
Hawthorne, California
Sepulveda Boulevard
Torrance, California
Wilmington, Los Angeles
Rivers of Southern California
Bike paths in Los Angeles